The 2011 Rossendale Borough Council election was held on 5 May 2011 to elect members of Rossendale Borough Council in Lancashire, England. One third of the council was up for election and the Conservative Party were in overall control of the council at the time of the election.

The composition of the council was:
 Conservative 19
 Labour 13
 Liberal Democrat 3
 Community First Party 1

Ward results

References

2011
2011 English local elections
2010s in Lancashire